Brett Michael Novek (born April 26, 1984) is an American male fashion model and actor. He is a campaign-level model for Papi Underwear and appears on their product packaging and sales and promotional material. In 2007, he was a contestant in season one of VH1's reality competition television program America's Most Smartest Model, in which he placed fourth.

Biography

Early life
Novek was born in Fort Lauderdale, Florida the second son of Robin and David Novek. He was born and raised in a Jewish family. Novek has an older brother, Craig, who he considers to be his best friend.

Novek graduated from the University of Central Florida in 2006, majoring in Marketing.

Early career
While working out at a gym, Novek met professional model Gregg Avedon, who submitted Novek's information to a modeling agency. An initial photo shoot was done with photographer Scott Teitler and this led to him signing with Irene Marie Models and modeling for clients such as Papi Underwear, which used Novek for an advertising campaign and live modeling events.

Recent events
In 2007 Novek moved from Florida to Los Angeles, California to pursue other modeling opportunities and video, television, and film work. Novek has signed with L.A. Models, and Joy Models Management in Milan, Italy.

After his father died from non-Hodgkin lymphoma in 2008, Brett started the clothing company Good HYouman in an attempt to save others from the heartache he felt, of which a portion of its profits goes to help people with leukemia and lymphoma.

America's Most Smartest Model
In May 2007, Novek participated as one of sixteen professional model contestants in the taping of season one of America's Most Smartest Model. The game show consisted of a series of challenges that led to each model being eliminated from the contest until only the winner remained. Novek symbolically tied with the eventual winner VJ Logan for the most number of challenges won, but ended the game in fourth place.

When the show aired later in the year, Novek appeared in episodes 1 to 9. He talked about his bar mitzvah in episode nines extras 'model behavior'. At the end of the ninth episode, Novek was eliminated. According to the judges, it was because of a disappointing performance in an automobile presentation challenge and because it appeared that he had lost his motivation after his friend and fellow contestant, Jeff Pickel, was eliminated the episode before.

Commercial Work
Novek has appeared in an Ashlee Simpson video ("Outta My Head"), an advertising campaign for LA Fitness, and in a 10 Minute Trainer fitness video (Tony Horton's 10 Minute Trainer).

Modeling clients include Hollister Co., Armani Exchange, Emporio Armani, Parke and Ronen, Cosmo Girl, and Target Corporation. His online clothing catalog credits include RevolveClothing.com and SportScheck.com.

In 2008, Novek appeared in a national television commercial for Taco Bell and another for Optimum Online.

Filmography

Film

Television

Personal life
Brett Novek lived with fellow America's Most Smartest Model contestant Jeff Pickel in Los Angeles, California. He currently lives with fellow model/actor Erik Fellows.

See also
 List of male underwear models

References

External links

Brett Novek Official MySpace page
Brett Novek Photo gallery
Brett Novek Model Mayhem page
Brett Novek Good HYouman page
Brett Novek Facebook page

Male models from Florida
1984 births
Male actors from Florida
Male actors from Fort Lauderdale, Florida
University of Central Florida alumni
Participants in American reality television series
Living people
Jewish American male actors
21st-century American Jews